Palm or Palms is a surname. Notable people with this surname include:

Palm 
 Anders Palm (born 1942), Swedish literary scholar and linguist
 Archibald Palm (1901–1966), South African cricketer
 August Palm (1849–1922), Swedish socialist activist
 Bert Palm (1915–1982), Australian lawn bowler
 Carl Magnus Palm (born 1965), Swedish author
 Charles E. Palm (1911–1996), American entomologist
 Christine Palm (born 1956), American politician 
 Conny Palm, (1907–1951), Swedish electrical engineer and statistician
 Cortney Palm (born 1987), American actress and author
 David Palm (born 1958), Australian footballer
 Douglas Palm (born 1955), Swedish tennis player
 Eero Palm (born 1974), Estonian architect
 Enok Palm (1924–2012), Norwegian mathematician
 Erwin Walter Palm (1910–1988), German Latin American scholar, historian and writer
 Evy Palm (born 1942), Swedish long-distance runner
 Franz Palm (born 1948), Belgian economist
 Fredrik Palm (born 1974), Swedish windsurfer
 Jacobo Palm (1887–1982), Curaçao-born composer
 Jan Gerard Palm (1831–1906), Curaçao-born composer
 Johan Palm (born 1992), Swedish singer
 Johann Philipp Palm (1768–1806), German bookseller executed during the Napoleonic Wars
 John Palm (1885–1925), Curaçao-born composer
 Leslie M. Palm (born 1944), American Marine Corps general
 Philip J. Palm (1906-1959), American newspaper editor and politician
 Reet Palm (born 1959), Estonian rower and coach
 Rudolph Palm (1880–1950), Curaçao-born composer
 Siegfried Palm (1927–2005), German cellist
 Thede Palm (1907–1995), Swedish historian
 Valter Palm (1905–1994), Estonian boxer
 Veiko-Vello Palm (born 1971), Estonian brigadier general
 Viking Palm (1923–2009), Swedish wrestler
 Wolfgang Palm (born 1950), German musician

Palms 
 Francis Palms (1809–1886), American landholder

See also 
 Palme (surname)
Palmer (surname)
Palmerston (disambiguation)

Swedish-language surnames
Estonian-language surnames